Kishwar Desai (née Rosha) (born 1 December 1956) is an Indian author and columnist. Her first novel, Witness the Night, won the Costa Book Award in 2010 for Best First Novel and has been translated into over 25 languages. It was also shortlisted for the Author's Club First Novel Award and longlisted for the Man Asian Literary Prize. Her novel Origins of Love, published in June 2012, was critically acclaimed. The Sea of Innocence, published in 2014 in India as well as in the UK and Australia, was widely discussed as it dealt with the issue of gang rape. Desai also has a biography, Darlingji: The True Love Story of Nargis and Sunil Dutt, to her credit. She wrote her latest book in 2020, released on 28 December, titled, The Longest Kiss.

Early life and education 
Born Kishwar Rosha on 1 December 1956 in Ambala, Punjab (now Haryana) to Padam and Rajini Rosha. She grew up in Chandigarh, where her father was the head of Punjab Police, and graduated from Lady Shri Ram College in 1977, in Economics (Hons).

Career
She started her career as a print journalist and worked as a political reporter with the Indian Express moving on to television and broadcast media after a while, where she worked for over two decades. She worked as anchor, TV producer and head of a TV channel with some of the major Indian television networks. She was also the Vice President at Zee Telefilms (Zee TV). She anchored Doordarshan's morning show, Good Morning Today, after which she took over as the CEO of Tara Punjabi TV channel, a part of Broadcast Worldwide, which was established by former STAR TV head, Rathikant Basu. Thereafter Desai moved to Zee and NDTV, where she worked as a producer.

Kishwar Desai has written four books. She currently writes columns for The Week magazine, The Asian Age and The Tribune newspapers.

Literary career
Desai's last novel The Sea of Innocence was the third in the series, featuring the feisty Indian middle-aged social worker-cum-crime investigator, Simran Singh.

Her award-winning novel Witness the Night, which was the first in the Simran Singh series, dealt with female foeticide. In a small town in the heart of India, a young girl, barely alive, is found in a sprawling house where thirteen people lie dead. Simran is now her only hope as she is charged with the murder of those dead. The judges of the Costa Award (Anita Rani, Anneka Rice and Mark Thornton) said "Kishwar Desai pulls off a remarkable trick, transplanting a country-house murder to modern-day India in a book that's not afraid to tackle serious themes". Witness the Night was also shortlisted for the Author's Club First Novel Award and longlisted for the 2009 Man Asian Literary Prize. In 2020, The Independent's Emma Lee-Potter listed it as one of the 12 best Indian novels, calling it a "stunning debut".

In Origins of Love, Desai took a close look at surrogacy and adoption. Simran Singh is asked to examine the case of an abandoned baby at an IVF clinic and what follows is a maze of new age fertility rites, and surrogacy. The book received critical acclaim in UK, Australia and India.
In her latest novel, The Sea of Innocence, Simran Singh is trying to find a British girl Liza Kay who has gone missing from the beaches of Goa. It was published in India, UK and Australia and received rave reviews. The Sea of Innocence had a reflection of the Nirbhaya gang-rape case in December 2012 in Delhi.

Desai's novels have been translated into many different languages, including Chinese, Spanish, French, etc.

Prior to writing fiction, Desai wrote a probing yet affectionate biography of Nargis and Sunil Dutt, two iconic Indian film stars, in Darlingji: The True Love Story of Nargis and Sunil Dutt. The book based on interviews with the Dutt family and friends, explored their lives in detail and tells the larger story of the evolution of Hindi cinema, and of a society and a nation in the throes of change. Desai has also written a play, Manto!, based on the life of the famous Urdu writer, Saadat Hasan Manto, which won the TAG Omega Award for Best Play in 1999.
Desai is now working on taking the Partition Museum forward and on a new book on Indian cinema. Desai also released a book in 2020, called The Longest Kiss which is the story of Bombay Talkies founder and actress Devika Rani.

Personal life
After her first marriage, she changed her name to Kishwar Ahluwalia and has a son, Gaurav and a daughter, Malika from the marriage. On 20 July 2004, after a divorce, she married economist Meghnad Desai, a member of the British House of Lords. She lives between London, Delhi and Goa.

She is a Trustee with the Gandhi Statue Memorial Trust, in which she helped to set up the statue of Mahatma Gandhi at Westminster Square in London. While the government allotted the space, the charity, chaired by Lord Meghnad Desai, had to raise the money for it. The statue was inaugurated by the then Prime Minister David Cameron and the Finance Minister of India, Arun Jaitley, in 2015. Later in 2015, Prime Minister Narendra Modi also paid his respects at the Gandhi Statue on his visit to the UK, accompanied by the members of the Gandhi Statue Memorial Trust and Prime Minister Cameron.

Works
 The Longest Kiss: The Life and Times of Devika Rani. Westland, 2020. 
 The Sea of Innocence. Simon &Schuster Limited, 2013. 
 Origins of Love. Simon & Schuster Limited, 2013. 
 Witness the Night, 2009 ; Simon & Schuster UK, 2012. 
 Darlingji: The True Love Story of Nargis and Sunil Dutt. HarperCollins India, 2007.

References

External links
 Kishwar Desai, Website

Indian women novelists
1956 births
Living people
People from Ambala
Delhi University alumni
English-language writers from India
Indian columnists
Indian women journalists
Indian television executives
20th-century Indian biographers
Indian women television presenters
Indian television presenters
Punjabi people
Indian women television producers
Indian television producers
Novelists from Haryana
21st-century Indian novelists
21st-century Indian women writers
21st-century Indian writers
20th-century Indian journalists
Indian women non-fiction writers
Women biographers
Indian women columnists
20th-century Indian women writers
Women writers from Haryana
Spouses of life peers
British baronesses
Journalists from Haryana
Women television producers